The 2014–15 Southeastern Louisiana Lions basketball team represented Southeastern Louisiana University during the 2014–15 NCAA Division I men's basketball season. The Lions, led by first year head coach Jay Ladner, played their home games at the University Center and are members of the Southland Conference.

Jay Ladner was hired at the end of the 2013-14 after winning the NJCAA Division I National Championship at Jones County Junior College.

The Lions were picked to finish seventh (7th) in both the Southland Conference Coaches' Poll and the Sports Information Directors Poll.

The Lions qualified for the 2015 Southland Conference tournament as the eighth seed due to ineligibility of three teams which finished higher in the regular season play.  The team played against number five seed McNeese State in the first round of the tournament losing in overtime 60-62.  The Lions's final overall record for the 2014–15 season was 9–23 and 6–12 in conference play tied for tenth place.

Roster
ֶ

Schedule
Source

|-
!colspan=9 style="background:#006847; color: white;"| Exhibition

|-
!colspan=9 style="background:#006643; color:white;"| Non-conference

|-
!colspan=9 style="background:#006847; color: white;"| Exhibition

|-
!colspan=9 style="background:#006643; color:white;"| Conference Games

|-
!colspan=9 style="background:#006847; color:white;"| 2015 Southland tournament

See also
2014–15 Southeastern Louisiana Lady Lions basketball team

References

Southeastern Louisiana Lions basketball seasons
Southeastern Louisiana
2014 in sports in Louisiana
2015 in sports in Louisiana